Events from the year 1660 in France

Incumbents
 Monarch – Louis XIV

Events
Carib Expulsion: French-led ethnic cleansing removes most of the Carib population of the island of Martinique.
Blaise Pascal's Lettres provinciales, a defense of the Jansenist Antoine Arnauld, is ordered by the king to be shredded and burned.

Births

January – Hippolyte Hélyot, historian (died 1716)
30 November – Victor-Marie d'Estrées, Marshal of France (died 1737)
4 December (bapt.) – André Campra, composer and conductor (died 1744)

Deaths
5 November – Alexandre de Rhodes, Jesuit missionary (born 1591)
1 December – Pierre d'Hozier, genealogist (born 1592)
3 December – Jacques Sarazin, sculptor (born 1588/90)

Full date missing
Christophe Tassin, cartographer (born early 1600s)
Jean Boulanger, painter (born 1606)
Étienne de Flacourt, governor of Madagascar (born 1607)
Richard Tassel, painter (born 1582)

See also

References

1660s in France